Steve Goulding (born 1954) is an English drummer, who has played as a member of Graham Parker and the Rumour, the Associates, Poi Dog Pondering, the Waco Brothers, Sally Timms and the Drifting Cowgirls and the Mekons. He also played the drums on the hit single "Let's Go to Bed" by the Cure and "Watching the Detectives" with Elvis Costello. He co-wrote "I Love the Sound of Breaking Glass" with Nick Lowe and Andrew Bodnar. He currently resides in New York City.

References

1954 births
The Associates (band) members
Living people
English rock drummers
British male drummers
New wave drummers
Musicians from London
The Mekons members
The Rumour members
Poi Dog Pondering members